Korobovia Korovnikov, 2007, is an extinct genus from a well-known class of fossil marine arthropods, the trilobites. It lived during the later part of the Botomian stage, which lasted from approximately 524 to 518.5 million years ago. This faunal stage was part of the Cambrian Period.

Etymology 
The genus has been named after the Russian paleontologist M. N. Korobov. The species epithet khorbosuonica refers to the Khorbosuonka River (a tributary of the Olenyok River), in the vicinity of which fossils of this species have been found.

References

 CEREGATO, A., RAFFI, S. & SCARPONI, D. (2006) The circa-littoral/bathyal paleocommunities in the Middle Pliocene of Northern Italy: The case of the  Korobkovia oblonga - Jupiteria concava  paleocommunity type. Geobios, 40: 555-572

Eodiscina
Cambrian trilobites
Fossils of Russia